Hennessy is a 1975 British thriller film directed by Don Sharp and starring Rod Steiger, Trevor Howard, Lee Remick, Richard Johnson, Peter Egan, Stanley Lebor and Sir Patrick Stewart, the latter in his film debut.

Plot
After the death of his family during a riot in Belfast, Niall Hennessy comes up with a plan to blow up the British Houses of Parliament.

Cast
Rod Steiger − Niall Hennessy 
Lee Remick − Kate Brooke 
Richard Johnson −Insp. Hollis 
Trevor Howard − Cmdr. Rice 
Peter Egan − Williams 
Eric Porter − Tobin 
Ian Hogg − Gerry 
Stanley Lebor − Hawk 
John Hallam − Boyle 
Patrick Stewart − Tilney 
David Collings − Covey 
John Shrapnel − Tipaldi 
Hugh Moxey − Stephen Burgess (M.P.) 
Margery Mason − Housekeeper 
Paul Brennan − Maguire
Paul Blake − Rally Leader
Patsy Kensit − Angie Hennessy

Production
The film was based on a story by actor Richard Johnson who called it "a modern re-telling of the Guy Fawkes story. There is absolutely no question of anyone trying to make entertainment out of terror. That is ridiculous."

"The film is not specifically orientated on politics," said Johnson. "It is simply a thriller using the Irish problem as a background."

The film was a co production between Peter Snell and American International Pictures (AIP). AIP sent a copy of a manuscript to John Gay who agreed to write the screenplay. The original director was John Guillermin and Gay says development involved three trips to London to confer with British Lion, who were co-producers, before the script was approved. Guillermin and Gay then flew to Italy to pitch the project to Rod Steiger, who was making a film about Mussolini. Steiger agreed to star.

Gay says that Guillermin then received an offer to direct The Towering Inferno so left the project. The flm had no director for two months until the producers signed Don Sharp, then directing Callan.

Production started in February 1974 and finished in September.  "It is not an agitational film," said Steiger. "This is a suspense thriller."

Since 1973 the IRA had undertook a bombing campaign in England including the 1973 Old Bailey bombing, the Bombings of King's Cross and Euston stations, the 1973 Westminster bombing, tje 1974 Houses of Parliament bombing, M62 coach bombing,1974 Tower of London bombing, the Guildford pub bombings, the Birmingham pub bombings, and the Woolwich pub bombing. This was why the Sunday Mirror called Hennessy "the most controversial British film made in years." Sam Arkoff of AIP said "We do not consider this a pro-IRA movie but we are very anxious to avoid public opinion in Britain. I think the film is brilliant. I realise the bombing campaign in Britain must have made people very bitter about the IRA. I ask people to see the film before they make up their minds."

Footage of Queen Elizabeth
The film contained footage of Queen Elizabeth II speaking at the State Opening of Parliament and apparently reacting to something happening in the House of Lords, taken in 1970. The clips were purchased by AIP from Movietone News and incorporated in the film. Johnson later said "We got permission before we even began filming. The film would not have been made as it has been made without it."

Buckingham Palace consented to use of the clip in the film but later said this was a misunderstanding as to the way the news footage would be used in the film and they would not do it again.

Release
The British Board of Film Classification initially refused to classify the film because of the footage. Producer Samuel Z. Arkoff managed to get it passed by adding a disclaimer stating that the British Royal Family had not participated and footage of the Queen was from newsreel and by cutting a six-second sequence where the Queen appeared to react to the explosion.

The Rank Organisation then refused to screen the film in its Odeon Cinemas, citing commercial reasons. EMI also refused to distribute it, with Chairman Sir Bernard Delfont claiming it was too sympathetic to the IRA to be shown at that present time. Critics such as Alexander Walker protested against this.

As a result, it was only shown at a small number of independent cinemas. However John Gay says it was financially successful.

Richard Johnson said "people are going to see it, and I think that proves my point: controversy is the stuff of entertainment and there are enough moral watchdogs around already without everybody jumping in. Audiences want to be made to think, to react for or against something. No one wants to watch dull or boring films. There's no halfway mark with something like Hennessy. I just hope that those against it will be outnumbered by those who are for it."

Critical Reception
The Guardian called it "quite a good thriller". The Los Angeles Times called it "routine but competent."

References

External links

Hennessy at YouTube

British thriller films
1975 films
1970s thriller films
Films about the Irish Republican Army
Films about The Troubles (Northern Ireland)
Films set in London
Films directed by Don Sharp
Golan-Globus films
Films with screenplays by John Gay (screenwriter)
Films scored by John Scott (composer)
1970s English-language films
1970s British films